Orangeville/Brundle Field Airport, formerly , was a registered aerodrome located  west southwest of Orangeville, Ontario Canada.

See also
Orangeville/Castlewood Field Aerodrome

References

Defunct airports in Ontario
Transport in Orangeville, Ontario
Buildings and structures in Dufferin County